Company Sergeant Major John Robert Osborn, VC (2 January 1899 − 19 December 1941) was a Canadian soldier. Osborn was a recipient of the Victoria Cross (VC), the highest and most prestigious award for gallantry in the face of the enemy that can be awarded to British and Commonwealth forces. He was born in Norfolk, England, and served in the Royal Navy during World War I.

Details
Osborn was born in England and came to Canada in 1920, after serving World War I with the Royal Naval Volunteer Reserve. Osborn first lived in Saskatchewan and then settled in Winnipeg, Manitoba. He was 42 years old, and a Warrant Officer Second Class, holding an appointment as Company Sergeant-Major for A Company in the 1st Battalion, The Winnipeg Grenadiers, during the Second World War when the following deed took place on Mount Butler, Hong Kong for which he was awarded the VC.

His citation in the London Gazette reads: 

Osborn was the first Canadian awarded a Victoria Cross in the Second World War. His was the only Victoria Cross awarded for Battle of Hong Kong.

Legacy
Tributes in Hong Kong

 Osborn Barracks in Kowloon Tong, New Kowloon, was named after him (since 1997 the site is known as Kowloon East Barracks).
 Osborn is memorialised by a statue of an anonymous World War I soldier located in Hong Kong Park. The statue was originally part of the Eu Tong Sen statuary collection at Eucliff villa. When Eucliff villa was demolished, the statue was donated to Osborn Barracks in Kowloon in the 1980s and where it stayed for ten years before being relocated to Hong Kong Park.
 In 2005, a plaque remembering Osborn's sacrifice was unveiled on the Hong Kong Trail parallel to where he fell. The supposed spot where he died is marked by a pile of rocks nearby the sign, but is relatively inaccessible due to heavy foliage.
 His name is engraved on the memorial hall of Sai Wan War Cemetery in Hong Kong.

Tributes in Canada

 In 2005, Historica Canada created a Heritage Minute honouring his heroic sacrifice.
 Osborn Avenue, a residential street in Brantford, Ontario, is named after him.
 His medals are displayed in the Canadian War Museum, Ottawa, Ontario.
 There is an ANAVets unit in Winnipeg, Manitoba, named after him: ANAF John Osborn VC unit #1.
 The St. Vital Victorias junior ice hockey team in Winnipeg is named in memory of Osborn and his Victoria Cross.

See also
Falling on a grenade
John K. Lawson

References

External links

 Canadian Government website biography and citation:  OSBORN, John Robert
 Report on John Osborn from HKVCA web site
 Historica's Osborn of Hong Kong

1899 births
1941 deaths
Canadian World War II recipients of the Victoria Cross
Canadian military personnel killed in World War II
Deaths by hand grenade
English emigrants to Canada
Royal Naval Volunteer Reserve personnel of World War I
People from Breckland District
History of Hong Kong
Battle of Hong Kong
Canadian Army soldiers
Burials at Sai Wan War Cemetery
Canadian Army personnel of World War II
People from St. Vital, Winnipeg
Canadian military personnel of World War I
Military personnel from Norfolk
Winnipeg Grenadiers
Winnipeg Grenadiers soldiers